Henry Byron Davies, Baron Davies of Gower (born 4 September 1952) is a Welsh politician, life peer and former police officer. He has been serving as a Lord in Waiting since September 2022.

Early life and career
Byron Davies was  born in Port Eynon, Gower and educated at Gowerton Boys’ Grammar School. He was a police officer in London before his selection as a Welsh Conservative Assembly candidate. While in the police he attained senior rank as a detective in the Metropolitan Police Service.

Political career
On 7 May 2015, he was elected the Member of Parliament for Gower at the 2015 general election. Previously elected as a member of National Assembly for Wales, on 9 May 2015, (shortly after the Westminster election) he decided to step down as an Assembly Member so that he could fulfill his parliamentary duties for Gower. Davies had become a South Wales West Assembly Member at the May 2011 election.

Davies was opposed to Brexit prior to the 2016 referendum. He was defeated at the 2017 general election.

Post Parliamentary career
From September 2017 to September 2020, Davies served as chair of the Welsh Conservatives taking over from former MP and MEP Jonathan Evans.

House of Lords
Davies was nominated for a life peerage in Theresa May's resignation honours list on 10 September 2019. He was created Baron Davies of Gower, of Gower in the County of Swansea, on 10 October 2019.

Honours

References

Offices held

|-

|-

1952 births
Conservative Party (UK) life peers
Conservative Party members of the Senedd
Living people
Metropolitan Police officers
Life peers created by Elizabeth II
UK MPs 2015–2017
Wales AMs 2011–2016